India competed at the 1996 Summer Olympics in Atlanta, United States. Leander Paes' bronze in the men's tennis event was the only medal won by the country. It had been 44 years since an Indian last won an individual medal at the Olympics (K. D. Jadhav earned bronze for freestyle bantamweight wrestling at the 1952 Summer Olympics, Helsinki). The medal was also India's first since their men's hockey team won gold at the 1980 Moscow Olympics. Subash Razdan, a prominent Indian American community leader in Atlanta was appointed Attache  for India by the Indian Olympic Association. He also served as the acting chef-de-mission  for the Indian contingent.

Medalists

Contingent by sport

Archery

In India's third appearance in Olympic archery, the nation was represented by three men. Lalremsanga Chhangte was the only one to win a match.

Athletics

Track And Road Events

Field Events

Badminton

Boxing

Equestrian

Field Hockey
Team Roster:
Subbaiah Anjaparavanda
Harpreet Singh
Mohammed Riaz
Sanjeev Kumar
Baljeet Singh
Sabu Varkey
Mukesh Kumar
Rahul Singh
Dhanraj Pillay
Pargat Singh (captain)
Baljit Singh Dhillon
Alloysuis Edwards
Anil Alexander
Gavin Ferreira
Ramandeep Singh
Dilip Tirkey

Preliminary round

Group A

Classification matches

Fifth to eighth place classification

Crossover

Seventh and eighth place 

8th Place Finish

Judo

Shooting

Swimming

Table Tennis

Tennis

Weightlifting

Wrestling

References

Nations at the 1996 Summer Olympics
1996
Summer Olympics